Professor  Johnbull  is a Nigerian comedy TV series, which has 6 seasons.  It is based on reviving morals in the Nigerian society. The series premiered on NTA Network, NTA on StarTimes, and NTA International in July 19, 2016. It was later aired on DSTV and GOTV in 2018. The TV series was sponsored by GlobaCom and produced by Tchidi Chikere. Professor Johnbull stars Kanayo O. Kanayo in the lead role from whom it derived the name Professor Johnbull Eriweagwuaagwu Macwigwe, Queen Nwokoye as Elizabeth, Angela Okorie as Nje, the house help, Osita Iheme as Jeroboam,
Chinedu Okolie known as Flavour and Korede Bello who are musical artists appeared in some of the TV series.

Plot 
It  is about the family of Professor Johnbull characterized as a widower, retired professor and a community leader.> Kanayo O. Kanayo acted as Professor Johnbull. The professor's neighbours troop to his house to resolve all sort of issues, his neighbours and community members prefer taking conflicts to his residence  because of his expertise in  resolving conflicts morally. His residence is full of constant activities of people coming to seek advice from Professor Johnbull on how to settle disputes among themselves. Each episode starts with a conflict, which the Professor resolves and ends with a closing quote encouraging the community to portray good conduct, moral rectitude and always upright in dealing with people.

Selected episodes of season 1

Cast 
Kanayo O. Kanayo in the lead role as Professor Johnbull
Patience Ozokwor as Madam Christian
Chika Okpala
Queen Nwokoye as Elizabeth
Angela Okorie as Nje
Queen Nwokoye as Elizabeth
Osita Iheme as Jeroboam
Yomi Fash Lanso as Restaurateur
Funky Mallam as yam seller
Bidemi Kosoko as Jumoke
Stephen Odimgbe as Flash boy,
Imeh Bishop as Etuk
Mercy Johnson as Caro
Pope Odonwodo as Churchill>
Bimbo Akintola as Ufoma
Martins Nebo as Abenego
Ayo Makun
Richard Mofe-Damijo
Stan kamandi as Athan
U.C. Ukeje as Efosa
Sani Danja as Malik
Bovi Ugboma

Accolades 

In 2018, Professor Johnbull was nominated for Best Television Series by Africa Magic Viewers' Choice Awards.

References

External links 

https://www.thenetnaija.com/videos/nollywood/3756-professor-johnbull/season-1/episode-10

Nigerian television series
Nigerian drama television series
2010s Nigerian television series
Television shows set in Nigeria
Nigerian Television Authority original programming